The 2015 European Cross Country Championships was the 22nd edition of the cross country running competition for European athletes. It was hosted in Hyères, France.

The 2014 runner-up Ali Kaya took the men's senior title, retaining the crown for Turkey. Spain, led by 2013 champion Alemayehu Bezabeh, returned to the top of the team rankings in that category. Sifan Hassan of the Netherlands was the women's senior winner, building upon her under-23 title win of 2013. Great Britain defended the women's team title, led by Kate Avery, who was runner-up for a second time running. Both senior individual runners were non-European born (Kenya for Kaya and Ethiopia for Hassan). All of the top five finishers in the men's race were born outside Europe.

Race results

Senior men

Senior women

Under-23 men

Under-23 women

Junior men

Junior women

References

External links 

 Results at European Athletics

European Cross Country Championships
European Cross Country Championships
European Cross Country Championships
European Cross Country Championships
International athletics competitions hosted by France
Var (department)
Cross country running in France